Karate is a martial art of Okinawan origin.

Karate may also refer to:

Music 

Karate (band), an American indie rock band
Karate, their 1995 album
"Karate" (song), by Babymetal, 2016
Karate, an album by Fitness, 2018
Karate, a 2015 EP by Anne-Marie, and its title track
"Karate", a song by Tenacious D from their 2001 album Tenacious D

Other 

Karate (film), a 1983 Hindi-language film directed by Deb Mukherjee
Karate (video game), a 1982 game for the Atari 2600.
Karate, the sidekick of the eponymous hero in the animated TV series Batfink
Karate, a brand name for the insecticide cyhalothrin

See also
 Karaite (disambiguation)
 Karate Baka Ichidai, Japanese anime that first aired in 1973
 Karateka, the Japanese word for a practitioner of karate
 Karateka (video game), 1984 computer game
 Karati, a town in south-western Ethiopia